James Stephens may refer to:

 James Stephens (MP) (died 1683), MP for Gloucester
 James B. Stephens (1806–1889), founder of East Portland, Oregon
 James Stephens (trade unionist) (1821–1889), Welsh-born Australian stonemason and trade unionist
 James Stephens (Fenian) (1825–1901), Irish revolutionary
 James Brunton Stephens (1832–1902), Scottish-born Australian poet and teacher
 James Stephens (Australian politician) (1881–1962), South Australian politician
 James Stephens (author) (1882–1950), Irish novelist and poet
 James Stephens (actor) (born 1951), American actor
 James Francis Stephens (1792–1852), English entomologist and naturalist
 James T. Stephens (born 1939), American heir, businessman and philanthropist

Other
 James Stephens GAA, a Kilkenny-based Gaelic Athletic Association club
 SS James B. Stephens, a 1942 liberty ship named for the founder of East Portland

See also
 James Stevens (disambiguation)
 James Stephen (disambiguation)

Stephens, James